Welsh High School (WHS) is a grade 9-12 senior high school in Welsh, Louisiana, United States. It is a part of Jeff Davis Parish Public Schools.

 it had 283 students.

Athletics
Welsh High athletics competes in the LHSAA.

Championships
Football Championships
(1) State Championship: 2017

References

External links
 Welsh High School
 

Public high schools in Louisiana
Schools in Jefferson Davis Parish, Louisiana